Aaron James Civale (born June 12, 1995) is an American professional baseball pitcher for the Cleveland Guardians of Major League Baseball (MLB). He played college baseball at Northeastern University, and was drafted by the Cleveland Indians in the third round of the 2016 MLB draft. He made his MLB debut in 2019.

Amateur career
A native of East Windsor, Connecticut, Civale attended Loomis Chaffee School in Windsor, Connecticut. He played college baseball at Northeastern University. He was honored as Co-Pitcher of the Year in the Colonial Athletic Association after going 9–3 with a 1.73 ERA for the Huskies. While playing for the Huskies, Civale pitched an exhibition game in Florida against the Red Sox at JetBlue Park. Before this start, he was a relief pitcher for the Huskies for two years. In 2015, he played collegiate summer baseball with the Hyannis Harbor Hawks of the Cape Cod Baseball League, where he was a league all-star, and received the Outstanding New England Prospect award. He was drafted by the Cleveland Indians in the third round of the 2016 MLB draft.

Professional career
Civale signed and spent 2016 with the Mahoning Valley Scrappers where he was 0–2 with a 1.67 ERA and 0.82 WHIP in 13 starts. In 2017, he played for both the Lake County Captains and Lynchburg Hillcats, posting a combined 13–6 record with a 3.28 ERA in 27 total starts between the two teams, and in 2018, he pitched with the Akron RubberDucks where he went 5–7 with a 3.89 ERA in 21 starts. He returned to Akron to begin 2019. Civale was promoted to the Columbus Clippers on June 6. He made seven starts between Double-A Akron and Triple-A Columbus going 5–0 with a 2.85 ERA before being called up.

On June 21, 2019, his contract was selected and Civale was called up to the major leagues for the first time. In his first game, he went 6 innings with 6 strikeouts against the Detroit Tigers and winning the game 2–0 after Brad Hand saved his 22nd game. He became the 10th Major League pitcher (and first for the Indians) since at least 1908 to toss at least  innings and allow 2 runs or fewer in each of his first six career appearances as a starter.

In 2020 he was 4–6 with a 4.74 ERA. He led the AL in hits allowed (82) and highest batting average against (.282). On June 23, 2021, Civale was placed on the injured list with a middle finger sprain. At the time of his placement, Civale led the MLB in wins with 10. On July 26, Civale was transferred to the 60-day injured list. Civale returned in September and on October 3, he was the winning pitcher in Cleveland's final game under their Indians nickname, pitching six scoreless innings against the Texas Rangers. He finished the 2021 season with a 12–5 record and a 3.84 ERA in 21 starts.

On January 13, 2023, Civale agreed to a one-year, $2.6 million contract with the Guardians, avoiding salary arbitration.

References

External links

Living people
1995 births
People from East Windsor, Connecticut
Baseball players from Connecticut
Major League Baseball pitchers
Cleveland Indians players
Cleveland Guardians players
Northeastern Huskies baseball players
Mahoning Valley Scrappers players
Lake County Captains players
Loomis Chaffee School alumni
Lynchburg Hillcats players
Akron RubberDucks players
Columbus Clippers players
Hyannis Harbor Hawks players